TVN is a television network headquartered in Panama City, Panama, with repeaters throughout the country. The stations broadcast in the NTSC format and DVB-T for Panama City. In DVB-T format it was the only TV station in HD for most of the day and they also broadcast in a sub-channel two hours behind programming from the main channel(DVB-T only), being the first TV station to have this service.

Main programming consists of local news, telenovelas, and Panamanian reality shows called Produccion Nacional (national productions). TVN rarely broadcasts sports, however, they launched sister station TV Max channel 9 to specialize in those programs.

History 
With help and participation from state-owned and foreign companies, the National Television and Radio System (Sistema Nacional de Radio y Televisión) was awarded a license in 1957, with help from local entrepreneurs and broadcasts officially commenced on April 23, 1962.

In 1967, a mobile unit was acquired, thus allowing the expansion of live events and shows seen on TVN, like El Show del Mediodía, La Lotería and horse races from the Presidente Remón horse track.

In 1969, when the country was starting to use satellite TV technology, it was amongst the first to air the apollo moon landings. In 1972 it became the first channel in the country to air in color.

In 1978, TVN transmitted their first World Cup, but on delay; rival RPC had the rights to air it live.

Regular programming 
The channel mainly broadcasts telenovelas and news. TVN has a separate news division under the name of "TVN Noticias", which publishes daily news content to its website and to its television news programs.

Location 
Current main offices and studios are located in Vía Ricardo J. Alfaro, Panama City, Panama, better known as Tumba Muerto, sharing installations with  FETV (Panama), and sister channel TVMax TV stations. TVN was formerly located alongside the Vía Transistmica, and had a studio alongside Avenida Balboa called Teatro ASSA.

References

External links 
 

Television stations in Panama
Television channels and stations established in 1962
Mass media in Panama City